Jorge Zuloaga (1 May 1922 – 1 June 2022), known artistically as El Topolino, was a Colombian comedian, actor, journalist and screenwriter, most recognized for his participation in the comedy show Sábados Felices between 1976 and 1998.

Life and career
Zuloaga was born in Bogotá on 1 May 1922. He began his career as a journalist by joining the newspaper El Espectador in 1952 in the judicial section. In the 1960s and 1970s, he worked on the radio as a reporter and screenwriter in media such as La voz de Bogotá, Todelar and Horizonte.

In the mid-1970s, Zuloaga was invited by presenter Alfonso Lizarazo to participate as a contestant on his program Sábados Felices. Given the good reception that his presentation had, Zuloaga was added to the main cast of the show, remaining until the end of the 1990s. As an actor, he participated in film and television productions such as The Woman from the Hot Land, The Millionaire Taxi Driver, One Hundred Years of Infidelity, The Strategy of the Snail and Pablo Escobar, The Drug Lord.

Personal life and death
Zuloaga married Teresa García in 1959, with whom he had four children. After his retirement from the media, he dedicated himself to writing books about his career and joined the Association of Former Caracol Workers. In 2015, he won a lawsuit against Caracol Televisión for irregularities in his contract when he was a member of the cast of Sábados Felices.

Zuloga turned 100 in May 2022, and died in Bogotá on 1 June.

References

External links 
 

1922 births
2022 deaths
Male actors from Bogotá
20th-century Colombian male actors
21st-century Colombian male actors
Colombian male film actors
Colombian male television actors
Colombian male comedians
Colombian screenwriters
Male screenwriters
Colombian centenarians
Men centenarians